Byron David Halsted (June 7, 1852 – August 28, 1918) was an American botanist and plant pathologist.

Halsted was born at Venice, New York.  He studied at Michigan State University and at Harvard (D.Sc., 1879).

In 1885, he began teaching botany at Iowa State and in 1889, he moved on to Rutgers in New Jersey.

In addition to his writings on biology and agriculture, Halsted was known for his book, Barn Plans and Outbuildings (New York: Orange Judd Co., 1894).

Halsted was an uncle of plant explorer David Fairchild who studied with him in Iowa and New Jersey.

'

References

External links

1852 births
1918 deaths
Michigan State University alumni
Harvard University alumni
Iowa State University faculty
Rutgers University faculty
American botanists
American phytopathologists